Maimón is a town in the Monseñor Nouel province of the Dominican Republic. Maimón is situated between Maimón river, La Leonora river, Yuna river and Zinc river, formed by a little valley and mountains in his sides.
The colonies that were established in Bonao needed to encounter an easy lane to get to  Concepción de la Vega, where was settled the general authorities at that time, the first Bonao was established in a little town that today is known as Sonador.

Notable people
Sal Garcías, Miss Dominican Republic 2016.
Juan Minaya, baseball player for the Chicago White Sox
Teoscar Hernandez, baseball player for the Toronto Blue Jays

References 

Populated places in Monseñor Nouel Province
Municipalities of the Dominican Republic